Fubini is a surname. Notable people with the surname include:

David Fubini, American business lecturer and writer
Eugene Fubini (1913–1997), American defense official
Guido Fubini (1879–1943), Italian mathematician
Sergio Fubini (1928–2005), Italian theoretical physicist

It can also be used to refer to Fubini's theorem.